Route 231 is a highway in the St. Louis, Missouri, area. It begins at U.S. Routes 61 and 67 (US 61 / US 67) in Arnold. It follows Telegraph Road through Jefferson and St. Louis counties, being Oakville's main thoroughfare. It then continues further North as Kingston Drive and then Broadway Street. It ends at River City Casino Boulevard, just inside the St. Louis city limits. The road continues north, further into the city, as Broadway. It closely parallels the Mississippi River for its entire route.

Major intersections

References

231
Transportation in Jefferson County, Missouri
Transportation in St. Louis County, Missouri